Arianism is a nontrinitarian Christological doctrine.

Arian may also refer to:

 

Arian is a surname that originated in Ancient Persia

Pertaining to Arius
 A follower of Arius, a Christian presbyter in the 3rd and 4th century
Arian controversy, several controversies which divided the early Christian church
Arian fragment, Arian palimpsest

People

Groups of people
 Arians or Areians, ancient people living in Ariana (origin of the modern name Iran)
 Aryan, a term associated with the Proto-Indo-Iranians
 Aryan race, the racial concept
 An inhabitant of Aria (today's Herat, Afghanistan), used by the ancient and medieval Greeks (as Ἄρ(ε)ιοι/Ar(e)ioi) and Romans (as Arii)

Given name
Arian Asllani (born 1983), American rapper known as Action Bronson
Arian Bimo (born 1959), Albanian footballer
Arian Çuliqi, Albanian television director and screenwriter
Arian Foster (born 1986), American football player
Arian Hametaj (born 1957), Albanian footballer
Arián Iznaga, Cuban Paralympian sprinter
Arian Kabashi (born 1996), Kosovan footballer
Arian Kabashi (born 1997), Swedish footballer
Arlan Lerio (born 1976), Filipino boxer
Arian Leviste (born 1970), American electronic music artist, producer, and DJ
Arian Moayed (born 1980), Iranian-born American actor and theater producer
Arian Moreno (born 2003), Venezuelan footballer

Surname
Arman Arian (born 1981), Iranian author, novelist and researcher
Asher Arian (1938–2010), American political scientist
Laila Al-Arian (born 1980s), American broadcast journalist
Sami Al-Arian (born 1958), Palestinian-American civil rights activist
Praskovia Arian (1864–1949) Russian and Soviet writer and feminist
Bruce Arians (born 1952), American football coach and former player
Jake Arians (born 1978), American football player

Other
 Arian (band), a pop band in Iran
 Arian (newspaper), an Iranian newspaper since 1914
 Arian, an outsider's name for a member of the Polish Brethren
 Arian, a person born under the constellation Aries (astrology)

See also
 Arian Kartli, ancient Georgian country
 Al-Arian, an Arab village in northern Israel
 Aaryan, a given name and surname
 Ariane (disambiguation), the French spelling of Ariadne, a character in Greek mythology
 Ariann Black, Canadian-American female magician
 Ariano (disambiguation)
 Arien (disambiguation)
 Arius (disambiguation)
 Ariyan A. Johnson
 Arrian, Greek historian
 Aryan (name)
 Ghamar Ariyan